Legendary is an American voguing reality competition streaming television series, exploring the world of ball culture. It premiered on HBO Max on May 27, 2020. The series follows LGBT house members—predominantly from eight to ten houses—as they navigate through nine balls (dancing/voguing/walking events), with US$100,000 prize for the winning house. As such, the series was praised by GLAAD for featuring queer and trans artists "from the New York ballroom scene."

In July 2020, HBO Max renewed the series for a second season. On April 17, 2021, HBO Max announced that the second season would premiere on May 6, 2021.

In June 2021, HBO Max renewed the series for a third season. On April 27, 2022, HBO announced that the third season would premiere on May 19, 2022.

In December 2022, HBO Max canceled the series after three seasons and removed it. On January 31, 2023, it was announced that the series will be released on The Roku Channel and Tubi.

Cast 
Each episode features a fashion and performance coaches responsible for polishing the houses' looks and moves on the dancefloor.
 Dashaun Wesley as Master of Ceremonies
 MikeQ as DJ
Johnny Wujek as Fashion Coach (seasons 1–2)
Tanisha Scott as Performance Coach
Jamari Balmain as Assistant Choreographer (season 2)

Format 

The contestants compete in groups named Houses, from which members perform individually or in groups in pre-assigned categories in front of a panel of judges. For seasons 1 and 2, each House is allowed to include five members, including a leader called the Mother or Father of the House. The panel is composed by four permanent judges and a fifth guest judge that changes on each episode.

Most categories involve a qualifying round, in which the member or group representing each house first perform for the judges, who according to ballroom terminology show their approval by giving them a "ten", or their disapproval by giving them a "chop". To advance, a contestant must receive no chops from any judges. In the second round, contestants face each other in knockout battles until only one of them remains, who is named the winner of the category. The winner of each battle is decided by a majority of the votes from the judges.

As an exception, when a category involves all the members of a House, instead of a qualifying round and a battle round each house performs in front of the judges and receives critiques, and then a winner is determined by consensus from the judges.

The Mother or Father of each House in the bottom names a member of the House to participate in a vogue redemption battle to be decided by the judges. The House of the winner of the redemption battle is allowed to remain in the competition, while the House of the loser of the battle is eliminated.

In the second season, a format change was introduced, with judges scoring each performance and the sum of the scores from the judges being used to determine the standing of the Houses.

Episodes

Awards and nominations

References

External links 

 Legendary on HBO Max
 

2020 American television series debuts
2022 American television series endings
2020s American LGBT-related television series
2020s American reality television series
2020s LGBT-related reality television series
American LGBT-related reality television series
American LGBT-related web series
American non-fiction web series
Dance competition television shows
HBO Max original programming
Reality web series
Transgender-related television shows